The University of Texas-University Charter School is a charter school operated by the University of Texas at Austin, serving about 500 students from kindergarten to 12th grade on twenty-three campuses across Texas.

References

External links 
official website

Charter K-12 schools in Texas
University of Texas at Austin